Felimida is a genus of sea slugs, dorid nudibranchs, shell-less marine gastropod mollusks in the family Chromodorididae.

Taxonomic history
Many of the species currently included in the genus Felimida were previously contained in the large genus Chromodoris until a revision of the family Chromodorididae in 2012 demonstrated that the name Chromodoris should be used for a smaller group of species.

Species 
 Felimida atlantica Padula, Wirtz & Schrödl, 2017
 Felimida baumanni (Bertsch, 1970)
 Felimida binza (Ev. Marcus & Er. Marcus, 1963)
 Felimida britoi (Ortea & Perez, 1983)
 Felimida clenchi (Russell, 1935)
 Felimida corimbae (Ortea, Gofas & Valdés, 1997)
 Felimida dalli (Bergh, 1879)
 Felimida edmundsi (Cervera, Garcia-Gomez & Ortea, 1989)
 Felimida elegantula (Philippi, 1844)
 Felimida fentoni (Valdés, Gatdula, Sheridan & Herrera, 2011) 
 Felimida galexorum (Bertsch, 1978)
 Felimida ghanensis (Edmunds, 1968)
 Felimida goslineri (Ortea & Valdés, 1996)
 Felimida kpone (Edmunds, 1981)
 Felimida krohni (Vérany, 1846)
 Felimida luteopunctata (Gantès, 1962)
 Felimida luteorosea (Rapp, 1827)
 Felimida macfarlandi (Cockerell, 1901)
 Felimida marislae (Bertsch, 1973)
 Felimida neona (Er. Marcus, 1955)
 Felimida norrisi (Farmer, 1963)
 Felimida ocellata (Ortea, Gofas & Valdés, 1997)
 Felimida paulomarcioi (Domínguez, García & Troncoso, 2006)
 Felimida ponga (Er. Marcus & Ev. Marcus, 1970)
 Felimida punctilucens (Bergh, 1890)
 Felimida purpurea (Risso in Guérin, 1831)
 Felimida regalis (Ortea, Caballer & Moro, 2001)
 Felimida rodomaculata (Ortea & Valdés, 1992)
 Felimida rolani (Ortea, 1988)
 Felimida ruzafai (Ortea, Bacallado & Valdés, 1992)
 Felimida socorroensis (Behrens, Gosliner & Hermosillo, 2009)
 Felimida sphoni Ev. Marcus, 1971

References

Chromodorididae
Taxa named by Eveline Du Bois-Reymond Marcus
Gastropod genera